Junk E.P. is an EP released by the trip hop/rap rock group Phunk Junkeez. The EP was released on January 1, 1999, on Uncle Scam Records.

Track listing

External links
 http://music.aol.com/album/junk-ep/690846

1999 EPs
Phunk Junkeez albums